Ranald Leask is the international public relations and media manager of the University of Edinburgh,  Previously, he was a public relations and media manager for the Commonwealth War Graves Commission. a position he was appointed to in May 2009.

Leask earlier spent ten years as a journalist in Scottish television, working as a reporter, producer, and presenter for STV News in Central Scotland.

Whilst studying for a Master of Arts degree in history at Aberdeen University, Leask worked for student radio and the campus newspaper.

References

Alumni of the University of Aberdeen
Scottish radio personalities
Living people
Year of birth missing (living people)